The white-throated or grey-bellied grass mouse (Akodon simulator) is a species of rodent in the family Cricetidae.
It is found in Argentina and Bolivia.

References

Musser, G. G. and M. D. Carleton. 2005. Superfamily Muroidea. pp. 894–1531 in Mammal Species of the World a Taxonomic and Geographic Reference. D. E. Wilson and D. M. Reeder eds. Johns Hopkins University Press, Baltimore.

Akodon
Mammals described in 1916
Taxonomy articles created by Polbot